The grey-bellied spinetail (Synallaxis cinerascens) is a species of bird in the family Furnariidae. It is found in the South American countries of Argentina, Brazil, Paraguay, and Uruguay. Its natural habitats are subtropical or tropical moist lowland forests and subtropical or tropical moist montane forests.

References

grey-bellied spinetail
Birds of Brazil
Birds of Paraguay
Birds of Uruguay
grey-bellied spinetail
Taxonomy articles created by Polbot